Toni Lanier Mannix (born Camille Bernice Froomess; February 19, 1906 – September 2, 1983) was an American actress and dancer in early motion pictures filmed with soundtracks, known as "talkies". Going by the name Toni Lanier, she became known in Hollywood circles for her extramarital relationship with future husband MGM studio head Eddie Mannix, who was married at the time to Bernice Fitzmaurice.  Following Fitzmaurice's death in 1937, Lanier moved in with Mannix. The couple married in 1951.  It was not long after her marriage to Mannix that she began a notorious affair with actor George Reeves, also in 1951.

Early life
Mannix was born Camille Bernice Froomess on February 19, 1906 in New York City. Her father, Charles, was a French immigrant, and her mother, Elizabeth, was a French Canadian Roman Catholic. The large family would ultimately include 11 children: seven boys and four girls. The children were raised in their mother's faith. Mannix's father was a department store window decorator in Rochester, New York, and her mother was a homemaker.

Career
For a time, Mannix was a Ziegfeld Follies showgirl and appeared in the Metro-Goldwyn-Mayer biography of Florenz Ziegfeld's life, The Great Ziegfeld (1936).

Personal life
As Toni Lanier, the Ziegfeld dancer and actress met MGM's general manager Eddie Mannix in the 1930s. She later lived with him as his mistress, and then as his wife, until his death in 1963. Shortly after her marriage to Mannix in 1951 and shortly before the launch of George Reeves to stardom in the successful television series Adventures of Superman, Mannix met and began an extramarital affair with Reeves, with the permission of her husband, according to Reeves' co-stars Noel Neill and Jack Larson.

Reeves ended the affair in 1958 after meeting and starting a relationship with "B-girl" Leonore Lemmon in New York while he was travelling on business. His death by gunshot wound to the head five months later was officially ruled a suicide, although questions have been raised about the circumstances under which he died. Mannix was devastated by Reeves' death and remained dedicated to him, reportedly building a shrine to him in her house.

Later years and death
 
Mannix, wealthy following the death of her husband in 1963, developed Alzheimer's disease when she was in her seventies. She died in 1983 in Beverly Hills at the age of 77, having neither remarried nor having had children.  She is interred next to husband Eddie Mannix at Holy Cross Cemetery in Culver City, California. Her crypt niche's memorial marker reads: "Camille Toni Mannix, 1906-1983, God Bless".

In popular culture
 
 Kashner and Schoenberger's George Reeves biography Hollywood Kryptonite states as an unsourced fact that Toni Mannix, using her husband's connections to organized crime, hired a hitman to murder George Reeves and stage it to look like a suicide.
 In the 2006 film Hollywoodland, Toni Mannix was portrayed by Academy Award-nominated actress Diane Lane, opposite Bob Hoskins as Eddie Mannix and Ben Affleck as George Reeves. Although the film offers a contract killing ordered by the Mannixes as one of several possible solutions to the mystery of Reeves' death, Hollywoodland ends without choosing any one theory as fact.
 Alison Pill played the wife of Eddie Mannix in the Coen brothers' 2016 comedy film, Hail, Caesar!. But Pill's character is fictional and not really Toni Mannix.

See also

References

External links

1906 births
1983 deaths
20th-century American actresses
American female dancers
American film actresses
Deaths from Alzheimer's disease
Deaths from dementia in California
People from Greater Los Angeles
Burials at Holy Cross Cemetery, Culver City
Actresses from New York (state)
American people of French-Canadian descent
American people of French-Jewish descent
American people of Russian-Jewish descent
20th-century American dancers
Ziegfeld girls